Transformers: Rise of the Beasts is an upcoming American science fiction action film based on Hasbro's Transformers toy line and primarily influenced by the Beast Wars storyline. The film is the seventh installment in the Transformers film series and a sequel to Bumblebee (2018). The film is directed by Steven Caple Jr. from a screenplay by Joby Harold, Darnell Metayer, Josh Peters, Erich Hoeber, and Jon Hoeber. It will star Anthony Ramos, Dominique Fishback, Luna Lauren Vélez and Tobe Nwigwe in his film debut, as well the voice talents of Ron Perlman, Peter Dinklage, Michelle Yeoh, Pete Davidson, Liza Koshy, Cristo Fernández, Michaela Jaé Rodriguez, and previous voice actors, Peter Cullen, John DiMaggio and David Sobolov.

Following the critical and commercial success of Bumblebee, Paramount and Hasbro announced a sequel would be happening in early 2019. In November 2020, Caple was hired as director for the film, becoming the first filmmaker of color to direct a live-action Transformers film. By 2021, Ramos and Fishback were cast in the lead human roles, in a first for the franchise having its main leads being actors of color, and details for the film were revealed that summer in a virtual event held by Paramount. Like its predecessor, it is the second Transformers live-action film not to be directed by Michael Bay, who once again serves as producer.

Transformers: Rise of the Beasts is scheduled to be released theatrically in the United States on June 9, 2023, by Paramount Pictures. Two sequels are in development.

Premise
In the year 1994, a pair of human archaeologists from Brooklyn come into an ancient conflict through a globe-trotting adventure with the Autobots that ties in with three factions of the Transformers race: the Maximals, the Predacons and the Terrorcons.

Cast

Humans
 Anthony Ramos as Noah Diaz, an ex-military electronics expert who lives with his family in Brooklyn, trying to support them.
 Dominique Fishback as Elena Wallace, an artifact researcher at a museum whose boss keeps taking credit for her work.
 Lauren Vélez as Noah's mother.
 Tobe Nwigwe as Reek, a companion of Noah and Elena during their global trek. Nwigwe's character in the film was based on a mutual best friend of Caple's, who passed away prior to filming in 2021.

Transformers
 Peter Cullen as Optimus Prime, the leader of the Autobot resistance who transforms into a red 1987 Freightliner FLA semi truck.
 Ron Perlman as Optimus Primal, the leader of the Maximals who transforms into a gorilla.
 Peter Dinklage as Scourge, the leader of the Terrorcons and a trophy hunter, who transforms into a black Peterbilt 359 logging semi truck.
 Pete Davidson as Mirage, an Autobot spy who can project holograms and transforms into a silver-blue Porsche 964 Carrera RS 3.8.
 Liza Koshy as Arcee, a Female Autobot commando who transforms into a red-white Ducati 916 motorcycle.
 Cristo Fernández as Wheeljack, an Autobot scientist and mechanic who transforms into a brown and white 1970s Volkswagen Type 2 panel bus.
 John DiMaggio as:
 Stratosphere, an Autobot Air-Soldier who transforms into a Fairchild C-119 Flying Boxcar cargo plane, that provides transportation for the Autobots in their global adventure.
 Transit, a Transformer of an unknown faction that transforms into a School bus.
 Michelle Yeoh as Airazor, a Maximal who transforms into a peregrine falcon.
 David Sobolov as:
 Rhinox, a Maximal who transforms into a rhinoceros.
 Battletrap, a Terrorcon who transforms into an orange 1980s GMC TopKick C7000 tow truck.
 Michaela Jaé Rodriguez as Nightbird, a Female Terrorcon who transforms into a Nissan Skyline GT-R R33.

Non-speaking Transformers
 Bumblebee, an Autobot scout who transforms into a modified yellow-black 1970s Chevrolet Camaro with all-terrain extensions.
 Cheetor, a Maximal who transforms into a cheetah.
 Freezer, a Terrorcon who, in the film's toyline, transforms into weapon artillery for Scourge and his fellow Terrorcons.

Production

Development
In December 2018, when asked about the future of the Transformers franchise, producer Lorenzo di Bonaventura stated that another big Transformers movie "would be produced and that it would be "different than the ones that we've done before". He described the process as more of an "evolution", saying that there is more freedom to create and what they can do with it. After the success of Bumblebee, he acknowledged that the series will make some changes in tone and style, inspired by the film.

Director Travis Knight said his goal was to return to his animation studio Laika, though he acknowledged that he has a few ideas for a Bumblebee sequel. John Cena expressed interest in reprising his role in a sequel. Writer Christina Hodson said that "[she] knows where [she wants] to go with the next one". In late January 2019, a sequel was announced, due to the film's international box office performance. In March, di Bonaventura confirmed they were developing a script for a Bumblebee sequel.

In January 2020, Paramount Pictures was reportedly working on two different Transformers films, one written by James Vanderbilt and another written by Joby Harold. In November, Steven Caple Jr. was hired to direct Harold's script. On February, it was revealed that the film was going under the working title Transformers: Beast Alliance, hinting the introduction of characters from the Beast Wars franchise. 

During a virtual event held by Paramount in June, di Bonaventura and Caple revealed the official title as Transformers: Rise of the Beasts (revealing to be both a Bumblebee sequel and Beast Wars film in one), and confirming that it would feature the Maximals, the Predacons, and a new take on the Terrorcons. The visual effects for the Transformers and Beast Wars characters were provided by the Moving Picture Company, rather than Industrial Light and Magic from the previous installments. The film's tone and action were heavily influenced by Terminator 2: Judgment Day (1991).

Casting

In April 2021, Anthony Ramos was cast for the lead role in the film. Later that month, Dominique Fishback was cast opposite Ramos. It was also revealed that Darnell Metayer and Josh Peters had been hired to rewrite Harold's screenplay. Ultimately, Harold, Metayer, Peters, along with Erich and Jon Hoeber received screenplay credit, with Harold solely receiving story credit, while Ken Nolan, Tony Rettenmaier, Juel Taylor, and Vanderbilt received "additional literary material" credit off-screen.

In June, actress Lauren Vélez revealed that she has a role in the sequel. In the same month, Peter Cullen was confirmed to return as Optimus Prime for the film, and Ron Perlman was announced to be reprising his role as Optimus Primal from the Power of the Primes web series a week later. In July, Tobe Nwigwe revealed that he had a role in the film. In October 2022, Caple Jr. revealed that Michelle Yeoh and Pete Davidson will voice Airazor and Mirage, respectively, in the film.

On December 1, 2022, additional members of the voice cast were announced, consisting of Peter Dinklage as the film's antagonist Scourge, Michaela Jaé Rodriguez as the female Terrorcon Nightbird, Liza Koshy as Arcee, who is replacing voice actress Grey DeLisle from both Bumblebee and Revenge of the Fallen, Cristo Fernández as Wheeljack, and returning voice actors John DiMaggio and David Sobolov from previous installments in newer roles. DiMaggio voices both Stratosphere, an Autobot that originated from the toyline of Revenge of the Fallen and the Dark of the Moon video game from 2009–2011, and Transit, a Transformer that turns into a school bus. While Sobolov, being the sole cast member from the Beast Wars animated series, voices both the Maximal Rhinox and the Terrorcon Battletrap.

Caple revealed that more members of the voice cast will be revealed in the coming months and expressed interest to bring Mahershala Ali to provide voice work.

Filming
Principal photography began on June 7, 2021, in Los Angeles. Filming also took place in parts of Peru such as Machu Picchu, Cusco, Tarapoto, San Martín Montreal and Brooklyn. On October 20, it was announced that filming had officially wrapped.

Music
Jongnic Bontemps will provide the film's score, after previously working with Caple on his directorial debut, The Land. Bontemps is the first person of color to compose for a live-action Transformers film, and the third composer in the series after Steve Jablonsky and Dario Marianelli.

Marketing 
Paramount showed some footage from the film at their Cinemacon presentation in April 2022. A teaser trailer was released on December 1, 2022. During an interview with BET, Caple discusses his decision to handpick the trailer's song, a remix of "Juicy" by The Notorious B.I.G., due to the album "Ready to Die" being released during the period of the film's setting, which captures the feeling of New York as suggested by both Ramos and Fishback. The teaser trailer on YouTube broke records in its first 24 hours with 238 million views in Paramount's history, topping a record that was previously held by Top Gun: Maverick, and 494 million views and impressions on social media sites like Twitter and TikTok, surpassing the view count of different trailers for other films released in the same week such as Indiana Jones and the Dial of Destiny, The Super Mario Bros. Movie, and Guardians of the Galaxy Vol. 3. A 30 second TV spot for the film aired during Super Bowl LVII on February 12, 2023 alongside those films.

Release
Transformers: Rise of the Beasts is scheduled to be released theatrically in the United States on June 9, 2023, by Paramount Pictures. The film was delayed from its initial release date of June 24, 2022.

Future
In February 2022, the film was announced to be the first entry of three new installments in the Transformers series.

References

External links
 
 

2020s American films
2020s English-language films
2023 action adventure films
2023 science fiction action films
African-American films
American action adventure films
American science fiction action films
American science fiction adventure films
American sequel films
Di Bonaventura Pictures films
Films about ancient astronauts
Films directed by Steven Caple Jr.
Films produced by Don Murphy
Films produced by Lorenzo di Bonaventura
Films produced by Michael Bay
Films produced by Tom DeSanto
Films set in 1994
Films set in Brooklyn
Films set in Peru
Films shot in Los Angeles
Films shot in Montreal
Films shot in Peru
Hasbro Studios films
Hispanic and Latino American films
Interquel films
Live-action films based on animated series
Paramount Pictures films
Skydance Media films
Rise of the Beasts
Transformers: Beast Wars
Upcoming English-language films
Upcoming sequel films